The chestnut, also known as a night eye, is a callosity on the body of a horse or other equine, found on the inner side of the leg above the knee on the foreleg and, if present, below the hock on the hind leg.  It is believed to be a vestigial toe, and along with the ergot form the three toes of some other extinct Equidae. Darren Naish dissents from this belief, noting that the chestnut is "not associated with the metacarpus or metatarsus, the only places where digits occur."

Chestnuts vary in size and shape and are sometimes compared to the fingerprints in humans.  For purposes of identification some breed registries require photographs of them among other individual characteristics.  However, because chestnuts grow over time and horse groomers often peel or trim off the outer layers for neatness, their appearance is subject to change.

Distribution among equines

The evolution of the horse involved a reduction in the number of toes to one, along with other changes to the ancestral equid foot.  The chestnut is thought to correspond to the wrist pad of dogs and cats, or to be a vestigial scent gland similar to those found in some deer and other animals.

The domestic horse is almost alone among extant equines in having chestnuts on the hind legs.  Chestnuts are absent from the hind legs of asses and zebras.  The majority of domestic horses have chestnuts on all four legs, as does the Przewalski's horse, but a few horse breeds are reported to lack chestnuts on the hind legs.  These include:

Banker horse (most individuals)
Caspian pony (some individuals)
Icelandic horse (most individuals)

Grooming
Chestnuts grow over time, protruding from the surface of the leg.  Grooming for horse showing may include peeling or trimming the outer layers to give a neater appearance to the leg;  they may peel more easily if softened first with baby oil or moisturizer. If left alone, eventually the chestnut peels naturally.

See also
Ergot (horse anatomy)

References

External links
 Chestnuts And Ergots In Horses
 

Horse anatomy